Molly Elaine Menchel (born December 5, 1991) is an American retired soccer player who most recently played as a defender for Swedish club Eskilstuna United DFF.

College career
Menchel played four seasons for the Virginia Cavaliers, recording 96 appearances and scoring 13 goals. She earned several honors including an ACC All-Academic Team and ACC All-Tournament Team in 2011.

Club career
After playing a couple of seasons with D.C. United Women and Washington Spirit Reserves at W-League, Menchel was picked by the Washington Spirit in the 3rd round of the 2014 NWSL College Draft. In 2014, Menchel signed with Røa IL of Toppserien, the top tier division of women's soccer in Norway. In 2016, she signed with FC Kansas City. In the same year, Menchel signed with Apollon Limassol of the Cypriot First Division.

References

External links
 Player's profile at Virginia Cavaliers
 Player's profile at UEFA
 Player's profile at Scorersway

1991 births
Living people
Sportspeople from Alexandria, Virginia
American women's soccer players
Soccer players from Alexandria, Virginia
Virginia Cavaliers women's soccer players
D.C. United Women players
Washington Spirit players
Toppserien players
Røa IL players
National Women's Soccer League players
FC Kansas City players
Apollon Ladies F.C. players
Damallsvenskan players
Eskilstuna United DFF players
American expatriate women's soccer players
American expatriate sportspeople in Norway
Expatriate women's footballers in Norway
American expatriate sportspeople in Cyprus
Expatriate women's footballers in Cyprus
American people of Jewish descent

Women's association football defenders
Washington Spirit draft picks